Tajuria berenis is a butterfly in the family Lycaenidae. It was described by Hamilton Herbert Druce in 1896. It is found in the Indomalayan realm.

Subspecies
Tajuria berenis berenis (Borneo, possibly Sumatra)
Tajuria berenis larutensis Pendlebury, 1933 (western Malaysia)

References

Tajuria
Butterflies described in 1896